Mehroni is a constituency of the Uttar Pradesh Legislative Assembly covering the city of Mehroni in the Lalitpur district of Uttar Pradesh, India.

Mahroni is one of five assembly constituencies in the Jhansi Lok Sabha constituency. Since 2008, this assembly constituency is numbered 227 amongst 403 constituencies. 

Currently, this seat belongs to Bharatiya Janta Party candidate Manohar Lal who won in last Assembly election of 2022 Uttar Pradesh Legislative Elections defeating Kiran Ramesh Khatik of the Bahujan Samaj Party by a margin of 110451 v

votes.

References

External links
 

Assembly constituencies of Uttar Pradesh
Lalitpur district, India